Ringdal is a Norwegian surname. Notable people with the surname include:

Haakon Ringdal (born 1954), Norwegian businessman
Nils Johan Ringdal (1952–2008), Norwegian author and historian
Olav Ringdal (1921–1945), Norwegian resistance member 

Norwegian-language surnames